The Atlanta Regional Commission (ARC) is the regional planning and intergovernmental coordination agency for the metro Atlanta, Georgia, USA region, defined as the 11-county area of Cherokee, Clayton, Cobb, DeKalb, Douglas, Fayette, Forsyth, Fulton, Gwinnett, Henry and Rockdale counties. The city of Atlanta is contained within this region. It also serves as the metropolitan planning organization for those and nine more counties in the region: Barrow, Bartow, Carroll, Coweta, Hall, Newton, Paulding, Spalding, and Walton counties.

ARC and its predecessor agencies have coordinated the planning efforts in the region since 1947, when the first publicly supported, multi-county planning agency in the United States was created. At that time, the Metropolitan Planning Commission (MPC) served DeKalb and Fulton counties and the city of Atlanta (which is already in both of those counties).  Since then, ARC membership has grown to its current size of 11 counties and 75 municipalities.

The ARC is one of 12 regional commissions throughout Georgia. The ARC is funded through a number of sources: local, state and federal government entities and private funds.

Membership
The Board membership of the commission includes: 1) each county commission chairman in the 11-county region; 2) one mayor from each county (except Fulton County); 3) one mayor from the northern half of Fulton County and one mayor from the southern half of Fulton County; 4) the mayor of the City of Atlanta; 5) one member of the Atlanta City Council; 6) fifteen private citizens, one from each of the 15 multi-jurisdictional districts of roughly equal population, elected by the 23 public officials; and 7) one member appointed by the Board of the Georgia Department of Community Affairs.

Agency structure and functions
The ARC is divided into numerous department covering a broad range of issues, from the region's growing senior population to region-wide transit issues to geographic information system data. The agency's structure and functions can be outlined as follows:

Center for Community Services: Aging & Health Resources Division, Homeland Security & Recovery Division, and Workforce Solutions Division 
Center for Livable Communities: Community Development Division, Mobility Services Division, Natural Resources Division, Research & Analytics Division, and Transportation Access & Mobility Division
Center for Strategic Relations: Communications & Marketing Division, Community Engagement Division, and Governmental Affairs Division
Office of the Executive Director and Support services: Financial Services Division, General Services Division, Information Technology Division, Strategic Initiatives Division, Talent Management Division, and Secretary to the Board

Awards
Each fall, the ARC gives awards for noteworthy new projects. The categories are:
Development of Excellence, which usually goes to large projects like a redone town square
Exceptional Merit for Context Sensitive Neighborhood Infill Design
Exceptional Merit for Historic Preservation
Exceptional Merit for Infill Redevelopment
Livable Centers Initiative Achievement Award

References

External links
Atlanta Regional Commission

Organizations based in Atlanta
Urban planning in Georgia (U.S. state)
Atlanta metropolitan area
Local government in Georgia (U.S. state)
Metropolitan planning organizations
Councils of governments